Ladies Beach is a beach in Ulcinj, Montenegro. It is one of many beaches in Montenegro's South Coast with a special liking amongst the visitors to the region, as well as the local residents.

Ladies Beach is known for its curious waters, a mixture of sulfur from an underwater spring, radium and sea salts. Pine resin from the sea trees at Ladies Beach, wafts in the air above the beach. Locals have long believed that Ladies Beach and its sea caves offer curative powers for ailments, and specific help to women with fertility issues.

See also 
 Velika Plaža (Ulcinj)
 Ada Bojana beach and river Ada (Ulcinj)
 Buljarica
 Jaz Beach

External links
Ladies Beach Visitor Guide 
 Tourism, Montenegrin Coast, Beaches, Ženska (Ladies Beach) 
Ulcinj Riviera Beaches, Woman's Beach (Ladies Beach) 
Female Beach (Ladies Beach) in Ulcinj 

Beaches of Montenegro